The 1942 National Challenge Cup was the 29th edition of the United States Football Association's annual open cup. Today, the tournament is known as the Lamar Hunt U.S. Open Cup. Teams from the American Soccer League II competed in the tournament, based on qualification methods in their base region.

Gallatin F.C. from Gallatin, Pennsylvania won the tournament for first time defeating the defending champions, Pawtucket F.C. of Pawtucket, Rhode Island in the process.

External links
 1942 National Challenge Cup – TheCup.us

Lamar Hunt U.S. Open Cup
U.S. Open Cup